For new rail transport, a 2012 Rowville Rail Study studied the possibility of a rail link to Rowville, Victoria, Australia.

The first stage of the report was released in March 2012, and found that congestion on the Glen Waverley line, Belgrave line  and Dandenong line (from Caulfield to Pakenham) would reduce if the rail link were constructed.

The study cost A$2 million.

Stations 

Huntingdale - 2 new underground platforms under the existing ones
Monash Uni - underground beneath Wellington Rd median
 Mulgrave - elevated 
Waverley Park - underground beneath Wellington Rd median
EastLink - (possible future station) 
Rowville - underground

Design recommendations
 Minimum line design speed of 80 km/h
 No new level crossings
 Maximum vertical grade of 2%
 New stations should have enough space to build 230m long platforms

Results

References

Rail transport in Victoria (Australia)